The 2018 North Dakota Fighting Hawks football team represents the University of North Dakota during the 2018 NCAA Division I FCS football season. They were led by fifth-year head coach Bubba Schweigert and played their home games at the Alerus Center. The Fighting Hawks competed as an FCS independent. They finished the season 6–5.

North Dakota will leave the Big Sky Conference for all sports except football in 2018 and join the Summit League. Their football program will join the Missouri Valley Football Conference in 2020. Although being classified as an independent for football in 2018 and 2019, they will continue to play a full Big Sky schedule and their games will count in the conference standings for their opponents but the Fighting Hawks will be ineligible to win the conference championship.

Previous season
In their final season as a full member of the Big Sky, the Fighting Hawks finished the 2017 season 3–8, 2–6 in Big Sky play to finish in a three-way tie for 9th place.

Schedule

Game summaries

Mississippi Valley State

at Washington

at Sam Houston State

Idaho State

at Northern Colorado

Montana

at Sacramento State

Weber State

at Idaho

Portland State

at Northern Arizona

Ranking movements

References

North Dakota
North Dakota Fighting Hawks football seasons
North Dakota Fighting Hawks football